The Jockey Club del Perú in Lima is one of the leading racecourses in Peru.

Background 
The Jockey Club del Perú has a seating capacity for about 25,000 people. It is located at the district of Santiago de Surco in Lima.

Other than horse racing, the venue is also used for other events such as concerts.

Notable concerts
 Shakira (2003)
 Kansas (2009)
 Laura Pausini (2009)
 50 Cent (2009)
 Camilo Sesto (2009)
 Pet Shop Boys (2009)
 Tokio Hotel (2010)
 Stomp (2010)
 Backstreet Boys (2011)
 Paramore (2011)
 Camilo Sesto (2011)
 Selena Gomez - We Own the Night Tour (2012)
 Joe Cocker (2012)
 Robert Plant (2012)
 Morrissey (2012)
 New Kids on the Block (2012)
 Il Divo - Il Divo & Orchestra in Concert – World Tour (2012)
 Big Time Rush - Big Time Summer Tour (2012)
 The Wanted - Code Tour (2012)
 Laura Pausini - Inedito World Tour (2012)
 Demi Lovato - A Special Night with Demi Lovato (2012)
 Big Bang - Alive Galaxy Tour (2012)
 Super Junior - Super Show 5 Tour (2013)
 U-KISS - U-KISS Latinoamérica Tour (2013)
 Miguel Bosé (2013)
 Ringo Starr (2013)
 Morrissey (2013)
 Raphael  (2014)
 Ed Sheeran - x Tour (2015)
 Katy Perry - Prismatic World Tour (2015)
 Soy Luna Live (2017-2018)
 Katy Perry & Bebe Rexha - Witness: The Tour (2018)
 Super Junior - Super Show 7 Tour (2018)
 Phil Collins - Not Dead Yet Tour (2018)
 The Killers - Wonderful Wonderful World Tour (2018)
 Laura Pausini - Fatti Sentire World Tour (2018)
 Judas Priest - Firepower World Tour (2018)
 Luis Miguel - México Por Siempre Tour (2019)
 Arctic Monkeys - Tranquility Base Hotel & Casino Tour (2019)
 Lenny Kravitz - Raise Vibration Tour (2019)
 Muse - Simulation Theory World Tour (2019)
 Shawn Mendes - Shawn Mendes: The Tour (2019)
 Louis Tomlinson - Louis Tomlinson World Tour (2022)
 Maluma - Maluma World Tour (2022)
 Harry Styles - Love On Tour (2022)
 Karol G - Bichota Tour (2022)

External links 
 Official website of the Jockey Club del Perú

References 

Sports venues in Peru
Sports venues in Lima